Corneliu Călugăreanu (30 July 1930 – 2011) was a Romanian basketball player who competed in the 1952 Summer Olympics. He was born in Drăgănești-Vlașca, Teleorman. He was part of the Romanian basketball team that was eliminated in the first round of the 1952 tournament. He played both matches.

References

 

1930 births
2011 deaths
Basketball players at the 1952 Summer Olympics
Olympic basketball players of Romania
People from Teleorman County
Romanian men's basketball players